Doreen Cronin (born 1966) is an American writer of children's books, including Click Clack Moo: Cows That Type, a very well-received picture book illustrated by Betsy Lewin.

Life
Born in Queens, New York and growing up on Long Island, Cronin's first book was published by Simon & Schuster in 2000: Click, Clack, Moo: Cows That Type, a picture book that she wrote and Betsy Lewin illustrated. She completed law school and the book at around the same time. Illustrator Lewin was a runner-up for the annual Caldecott Medal.

Cronin lives in Brooklyn  with her two children.

Works 

 Click, Clack, Moo: cows that type (Simon & Schuster, 2000), illustrated by Betsy Lewin
 Giggle, Giggle, Quack (S&S, 2002), ill. Lewin
 Diary of a Worm (Joanna Cotler Books, 2003), ill. Harry Bliss
 Duck For President (S&S, 2004), ill. Lewin
 Diary of a Spider (2005), ill. Bliss
 Wiggle (2005), ill. Scott Menchin
 Click, Clack, Quackity-Quack: an alphabetical adventure (2005), ill. Lewin
 Click, Clack, Splish, Splash: a counting adventure (2006), ill. Lewin
 Dooby Dooby Moo (Atheneum Books, S&S, 2006), ill. Lewin – sequel to Click, Clack, Moo
 Bounce (2007), ill. Menchin
 Diary of a Fly (2007), ill. Bliss
 Thump, Quack, Moo: a whacky adventure (2008), ill. Lewin
 Busy Day at the Farm (2009), ill. Lewin
 Stretch (2009), ill. Menchin
 Rescue Bunnies (2010), ill. Menchin
 M.O.M. (Mom Operating Manual) (Atheneum, 2011), ill. Laura Cornell 
 —54 pages; ages 4–8; "A guide to the care and maintenance of mothers, who are, according to the manual, "the most advanced human models on the planet."
 Trouble with Chickens: a J.J. Tully mystery (Balzer & Bray, 2011), ill. Kevin Cornell 
 —119 pages; interest level ages 8–12; mystery featuring "a hard-bitten former search-and-rescue dog"
 Legend of Diamond Lil: a J.J. Tully mystery (2012), ill. K. Cornell
 Click, clack, boo!: a tricky treat (2013), ill. Lewin
 Boom, Snot, Twitty (Penguin Group, 2014), ill. Renata Liwska
 Nat the Gnat (2014), ill. Bliss 
 Chicken Squad Case #1: Full House (Atheneum, 2014), ill. K. Cornell 
 Click, Clack, Peep (2015), ill. Lewin 
 Cyclone (2017)

References

External links 
 
 Interview by Booksense 
 

1966 births
Living people
American children's writers
American women children's writers
Date of birth missing (living people)
21st-century American women